Lanžhot is a town in Břeclav District in the South Moravian Region of the Czech Republic. It has about 3,600 inhabitants. It is the southernmost Moravian town.

Etymology
The original Latin name Lanczhut and the German name Landshut meant "land guard", referring to its location on the border between Austria and Kingdom of Hungary. The Czech name is transcription of the original name.

Geography
Lanžhot is situated in the Lower Morava Valley. The municipal territory is located on the border with Austria and Slovakia. The eastern border (with Slovakia) is formed by the Morava and the western border (with Austria) is partly formed by the Thaya. Their confluence forms the tripoint of the Czech Republic, Austria and Slovakia. Other notable watercourses in Lanžhot are Kyjovka and Svodnice.

History
The first written mention of Lanžhot is from 1384.

Demographics

Transport
The D2 motorway goes through Lanžhot. There are two road border crossings and one rail border crossing with Slovakia.

Notable people
Edmund von Krieghammer (1832–1906), Austrian general
Antonín Bartoš (1910–1998), soldier and resistance fighter

Twin towns – sister cities

Lanžhot is twinned with:
 Rabensburg, Austria

References

External links

Cities and towns in the Czech Republic
Populated places in Břeclav District
Czech Republic–Slovakia border crossings